John Kelly (6 December 1929 – 13 November 2012) was an Irish racewalker, marathon runner, and actor. He competed in the men's 50 kilometres walk at the 1968 Summer Olympics.

John Kelly was born in Loughmore, a village in County Tipperary, Ireland.

Kelly won the 1965 Philadelphia Marathon, finishing the race in a time of 2:37:23 during a snowstorm.

Throughout the 1960s and 1970's he was a member of various track and field athletics clubs, including the Amateur Athletic Union, Southern California Striders and the Santa Monica Track Club.

In the 1970s Kelly became a member of the Screen Actors Guild and appears briefly in the musical film Star!, starring Julie Andrews and Richard Crenna.  In September of 1973, he was a guest on The Tonight Show Starring Johnny Carson.

References

External links
 

1929 births
2012 deaths
Athletes (track and field) at the 1968 Summer Olympics
Irish male racewalkers
Olympic athletes of Ireland
Place of birth missing